The Hartz Mountains are a mountain range on Baffin Island, Nunavut, Canada. It is located in Sirmilik National Park which is Baffin Island's northernmost national park. It makes up part of the Arctic Cordillera mountain system.

See also
List of mountain ranges

References

Mountain ranges of Qikiqtaaluk Region
Arctic Cordillera